The Abqaiq oil field is an oil field located in Eastern Province. It was discovered in 1940 and developed by Saudi Aramco. It began production in 1940 and produces oil. Much of its production is carried through the East-West Crude Oil Pipeline.

References

Oil fields of Saudi Arabia